Philip Mårtensson (born 1 September 1993) is a Swedish football goalkeeper who plays for Varbergs BoIS.

References

1993 births
Living people
Swedish footballers
Association football goalkeepers
Ettan Fotboll players
Superettan players
Allsvenskan players
BK Olympic players
Torns IF players
Trelleborgs FF players
Landskrona BoIS players
Varbergs BoIS players